Agnes Arnau and Her Three Suitors is a 1918 German silent comedy film directed by Rudolf Biebrach and starring Henny Porten, Hermann Thimig and Kurt Ehrle.

The film's sets were designed by the art director Ludwig Kainer.

Cast
 Henny Porten as Agnes Arnau
 Hermann Thimig as Tonny
 Kurt Ehrle as Hans
 Artur Menzel as Rittergutsbesitzer Hermann von Hermanntitz
 Berta Monnard as Luise, seine Frau
 Rudolf Biebrach as Arnau, Gutsbesitzer
 Paul Westermeier as Schauspieler

References

Bibliography

External links

1918 films
Films of the German Empire
German silent feature films
Films directed by Rudolf Biebrach
German comedy films
1918 comedy films
UFA GmbH films
German black-and-white films
Silent comedy films
1910s German films
1910s German-language films